Le bon roi Dagobert may refer to:

 Le bon roi Dagobert (song)
 Le bon roi Dagobert (1963 film), directed by Pierre Chevalier, starring Fernandel and Gino Cervi
 Le bon roi Dagobert (1984 film), directed by Dino Risi, starring Coluche and Michel Serrault

See also
 Dagobert I (603-639), subject of the song